Lovers is the debut studio album by Norwegian singer Anna of the North, released on 8 September 2017 by Honeymoon Records. It was preceded by the 5 singles "Baby", "Lovers", "Someone", "Money", and "Fire".

Track listing

Charts

References

2017 albums
Anna of the North albums